Anisoceratidae is an extinct family of heteromorph ammonites which belong to the Ancyloceratina superfamily Turrilitoidea. Members of the family range is from the lower Albian to the upper Turonian.  The family is possibly derived from a member of the Hamitidae.

Morphology
Anisoceratid shells begin as an irregular helical spiral which typically becomes confined to a single plane with growth. This is usually followed by at least a single straight shaft. Ribs and tubercles are common features.

History and classification
Older classifications, since first publication of Part L of the Treatise on Invertebrate Paleontology, include the Anisoceratidae in the suborder Ancyloceratina (within the Turrilitoidea). Subsequent study, e.g. Beznosov & Mikhailova 1983, has suggested that the Turrilitoidea, including the Anisoceratidae, have a different phylogeny from the true Ancyloceratina, resulting in their occasional reassignment to a separate suborder, the Turrilitina, however this classification is not widely followed.

References

Beznosov & Mikhailova 1983 referenced in A. Mikhailova and E. Yu. Baraboshkin, 2009. The Evolution of the Heteromorph and Monomorph Early Cretaceous Ammonites of the Suborder Ancyloceratina Wiedmann. Paleontological Journal, Vol. 43, No. 5, 2009.  
The Paleobiology Database Anisoceratidae entry

Cretaceous ammonites
Ammonitida families
Turrilitoidea
Albian first appearances
Turonian extinctions